Algaenan is the resistant biopolymer in the cell walls of unrelated groups of green algae, and facilitates their preservation in the fossil record.

References

Biomaterials